Luna 15 was a robotic space mission of the Soviet Luna programme, that crashed into the Moon on 21 July 1969.

On 21 July 1969, while Apollo 11 astronauts finished the first human moonwalk, Luna 15, a robotic Soviet spacecraft in lunar orbit at the time, began its descent to the lunar surface.  Launched three days before the Apollo 11 mission, it was the second Soviet attempt to return lunar soil back to Earth with a goal to outstrip the US in achieving a sample return in the Moon race. The previous mission, designated E-8-5-402, launched 14 June 1969, did not achieve Earth orbit because the third stage of its launch vehicle failed to ignite. The Luna 15 lander crashed into the Moon at 15:50 UT, hours before the scheduled American lift off from the Moon.

Mission
Luna 15 was capable of studying circumlunar space, the lunar gravitational field, and the chemical composition of lunar rocks. It was also capable of providing lunar surface photography. Luna 15 was placed in an intermediate Earth orbit after launch and was then sent toward the Moon. After a mid-course correction the day after launch, Luna 15 entered lunar orbit at 10:00 UT on 17 July 1969. The spacecraft remained in lunar orbit for two days while controllers checked all on-board systems and performed two orbital manoeuvres.

After completing 86 communications sessions and 52 orbits of the Moon at various inclinations and altitudes, it began its descent. Astronauts Armstrong and Aldrin had already set foot on the Moon when Luna 15 fired its main retrorocket engine to initiate descent to the surface at 15:47 UT on 21 July 1969. The spacecraft had probably crashed into the side of a mountain. Impact coordinates were 17° north latitude and 60° east longitude, in Mare Crisium. This (the impact site of LUNA 15) is some   NNE of the Apollo 11 LZ, in a direction of 328 degrees. 

An audio recording of the minutes in which British technicians at the radio telescope facility in Jodrell Bank observed Luna 15's descent was first made available to the public on 3 July 2009.

Implications
In a race to reach the Moon and return to Earth, the parallel missions of Luna 15 and Apollo 11 represented, in many ways, the culmination of the Space Race between the space programs of the United States and the Soviet Union in the 1960s.

The simultaneous missions became one of the first instances of Soviet–American space communication: the Soviet Union released Luna 15's flight plan to ensure it would not collide with Apollo 11, although its exact mission was not publicized.

References

External links
 Zarya - Luna programme chronology
 NASA NSSDC Master Catalog

Luna programme
Sample return missions
Missions to the Moon
Spacecraft launched in 1969
1969 in the Soviet Union
Spacecraft that impacted the Moon
Spacecraft that orbited the Moon
1969 on the Moon